Temnostoma daochus  (Walker, 1849), the Yellow-spotted Falsehorn, is a rare species of syrphid fly observed in the eastern United States. Hoverflies can remain nearly motionless in flight. The adults are also known as flower flies for they are commonly found on flowers, from which they get both energy-giving nectar and protein-rich pollen. Temnostoma adults are strong wasp mimics. The larvae burrow in moist decayed wood.

Distribution
United States

References

Eristalinae
Insects described in 1849
Diptera of North America
Taxa named by Francis Walker (entomologist)